Petr Horyna is a former Czechoslovak slalom canoeist who competed in the 1960s.

He won a gold medal in the mixed C-2 team event at the 1969 ICF Canoe Slalom World Championships in Bourg St.-Maurice.

References
Overview of athlete's results at canoeslalom.net 

Czechoslovak male canoeists
Possibly living people
Year of birth missing (living people)
Medalists at the ICF Canoe Slalom World Championships